Johann Théo Tom Lepenant (born 22 October 2002) is a French professional footballer who plays as a midfielder for Ligue 1 club Lyon.

Club career 
Lepenant made his professional debut for Stade Malherbe Caen on 12 September 2020.

On 22 June 2022, Lepenant signed for Lyon on a five-year deal.

Career statistics

References

External links
 Profile at the Olympique Lyonnais website
 

 

2002 births
Living people
People from Granville, Manche
Sportspeople from Manche
French footballers
Footballers from Normandy
Association football midfielders
France youth international footballers
Ligue 1 players
Ligue 2 players
Stade Malherbe Caen players
Olympique Lyonnais players